Acalolepta fraudatrix is a species of beetle in the family Cerambycidae. It was described by Henry Walter Bates in 1873. It is known from Korea, Japan, China, and Russia.

Subspecies
 Acalolepta fraudatrix fraudatrix (Bates, 1873)
 Acalolepta fraudatrix mogii Makihara, 1980
 Acalolepta fraudatrix nigricornis Makihara, 1977
 Acalolepta fraudatrix satoi Breuning & Ohbayashi, 1966
 Acalolepta fraudatrix yakushimana Yokoyama, 1971

References

Acalolepta
Beetles described in 1873